Nizhnekamsk (Tübän Qama) is a city in Tatarstan, Russia, located to the south of the Kama River between the cities of Naberezhnye Chelny and Chistopol. Population:

History
It was founded in 1961 as the work settlement of Nizhnekamsk. As its population increased, spurred by the construction of Nizhnekamskneftekhim petrochemical industrial complex, Nizhnekamsk was granted city status in 1966.

Sightseeings
- Musa Jalil Park;
- "Maydan" - the place where the town festivals are held;
- the famous Holy Spring;
- "Neftehimik" ice hockey hall;
- the museum of the town.

Administrative and municipal status
Within the framework of administrative divisions, Nizhnekamsk serves as the administrative center of Nizhnekamsky District, even though it is not a part of it. As an administrative division, it is, together with three rural localities, incorporated separately as the city of republic significance of Nizhnekamsk—an administrative unit with the status equal to that of the districts. As a municipal division, the city of republic significance of Nizhnekamsk is incorporated within Nizhnekamsky Municipal District as Nizhnekamsk Urban Settlement.

Economy
The city remains an important center of the petrochemical industry (Nizhnekamskneftekhim plant). It is served by the Begishevo Airport.

Demographics
Ethnic composition:
Russians: 47.1%
Tatars: 46.5%
Chuvash people: 3.0%
Ukrainians: 1.0%
Bashkirs: 1.0%

Sports
HC Neftekhimik Nizhnekamsk is an ice hockey team based in Nizhnekamsk, playing in the Kontinental Hockey League.

References

Notes

Sources

External links
Unofficial website of Nizhnekamsk 
Article about Nizhnekamsk and the surrounding area 

Cities and towns in Tatarstan
Cities and towns built in the Soviet Union
Populated places established in 1961
Populated places on the Kama River